Court of Current Issues (initially known as Court of Public Opinion) is a nontraditional court show featuring public-affairs debates. The program aired live on Tuesday nights from 1948-1951 on the DuMont Television Network. Originally a half-hour in length, it expanded to 60 minutes in 1949.

The program featured oral arguments on topical issues using the format of a courtroom. A judge presided, and people from "representative national groups" formed the jury.

Irvin Paul Sulds was the producer.

The series was scheduled opposite Milton Berle's popular Texaco Star Theater on NBC, hence it did not receive a wide audience.

Following its network demise, the program ran on local TV in New York "for some time".

Episode status
A 14-minute fragment from the March 3, 1949 episode survives at the Paley Center for Media.

See also
 List of programs broadcast by the DuMont Television Network
 List of surviving DuMont Television Network broadcasts

Bibliography
 David Weinstein, The Forgotten Network: DuMont and the Birth of American Television (Philadelphia: Temple University Press, 2004) 
 Alex McNeil, Total Television, Fourth edition (New York: Penguin Books, 1980) 
 Tim Brooks and Earle Marsh, The Complete Directory to Prime Time Network TV Shows, Third edition (New York: Ballantine Books, 1964)

References

External links
 
 DuMont historical website

DuMont Television Network original programming
Court shows
1948 American television series debuts
1951 American television series endings
American live television series
Black-and-white American television shows
English-language television shows